In bacterial genetics, the mal regulon is a regulon - or group of genes under common regulation - associated with the catabolism of maltose and maltodextrins. The system is especially well characterized in the model organism Escherichia coli, where it is classically described as a group of ten genes in multiple operons whose expression is regulated by a single regulatory protein, malT. MalT binds to maltose or maltodextrin and undergoes a conformational change that allows it to bind DNA at sequences near the promoters of genes required for uptake and catabolism of these sugars. The maltose regulation system in E. coli is a classic example of positive regulation. malT is regulated by catabolite repression via the catabolite activator protein. Genes under the control of malT include ATP-binding cassette transporter components, maltoporin, maltose binding protein, and several enzymes. Other Gram-negative bacteria such as Klebsiella pneumoniae have additional genes under the control of malT.

In many Gram-positive bacteria, such as Streptococcus pneumoniae, maltose catabolism is regulated differently, via a transcriptional repressor called malR, in the lac repressor family.

References

Bacterial genetics
Molecular biology